Murray Sumsion Vandepeer (c. 1929 – 14 September 2008) was an Australian politician who represented the South Australian House of Assembly seat of Millicent from 1975 to 1977 for the Liberal Party.

References

 

Members of the South Australian House of Assembly
Liberal Party of Australia members of the Parliament of South Australia
2008 deaths
Liberal and Country League politicians
1920s births
20th-century Australian politicians